The Waterford Annual Lawn Tennis Tournament  was a men's tennis tournament was played on outdoor grass courts in Waterford, Ireland from 1880 through 1979.

History
The Waterford Annual Lawn Tennis Tournament was played at Waterford Cricket Club, Rocklands later called Waterford Lawn Tennis club  in Ireland on outdoor grass courts from 1880 to 1888 for twelve editions only.

The tournament featured on both the 1877 Men's Tennis tour and the 1877 Women's Tennis Tour

Past tournaments
Included:

Men's singles

References
Citations

Sources
 Evelegh, B. C. (1883-1891). ed. The "Field" Lawn Tennis Calendar. London. England.
 Longman C.J. and Walrond H. (1880-1891). ed's The Badminton Library of Sports and Pastimes. London. Longmans Green and Company.

External links
http://www.stannestennis.com/index.php/about/club-history/

Grass court tennis tournaments
Tennis tournaments in Ireland
Defunct tennis tournaments in the Republic of Ireland
Defunct sports competitions in the Republic of Ireland